Angel Bat Dawid (born 1979) is a Black American composer,  clarinetist, pianist, vocalist, producer, educator & DJ. Her critically-acclaimed album, The Oracle, has been featured in Pitchfork, BBC, Rolling Stone, The Guardian, The Washington Post, The New York Times, and The Chicago Sun Times.

Life and career 
Dawid was born in Atlanta, GA on October 17, 1979. Her father attended Moorehouse College. After marrying Dawid's mother, the family moved to her father's hometown of Louisville, KY. In 1986, the family moved to Kenya where Dawid's parents were southern baptist missionaries. They spent four years living in the city of Machakos, Kenya, after which they moved back to Louisville when Dawid was 12. When Dawid was in her teens they relocated to Chicago, IL, as her parents pursued more ministry opportunities. Dawid's parents identify as Black Hebrew Israelites.

Dawid studied classical music at Roosevelt University as a clarinet performance major, but after experiencing a medical crisis, took a job in retail to pay medical bills. After a number of years working she cashed out her 401K to pursue music full-time in 2014. Dawid joined a jam session with multi-instrumentalist Chicago composer David Boykin, and met with members of the Association for the Advancement of Creative Musicians. Dawid later co-founded the Chicago-based creative music collective The Participatory Music Coalition.

Dawid tours internationally solo and with her septet "Tha Brothahood" releasing their album "LIVE" making NPR’s best of 2020 list. She leads the all-woman ensemble Sistazz of the Nitty Gritty (named by Lonnie Holley). To great acclaim Sistazz of the Nitty Gritty opened for Sun Ra Arkestra at New York Central Park Summerstage.

As half of the duo group DAOUI, Dawid and sound artist Oui Ennui produced, mixed and self-released the album “Message from the DAOUI," which was featured at Tusk Festival 2020. She is a clarinetist in Damon Lock's Black Monument Ensemble as well as DJ. Dawid hosts a monthly music show on NTS Radio.

Dawid's collaborators include Marshall Allen of the Sun Ra Arkestra.

Teaching 
Dawid is committed to education and plans to open a music school. As an educator Angel has taught her “Great Black Music” course at Cook County Juvenile Temporary Detention Center through Old Town School of Folk in Chicago.

Recognition 
Dawid was one of the commissioned composers for the 2019 Hyde Park Jazz Festival where she premiered her original work “Requiem for Jazz." She premiered her work “Peace: A Suite for Skylanding” in 2020, which was commissioned by the Art Institute of Chicago for Yoko Ono’s outdoor Skylanding Installation.

Dawid was recently honored as 2021 "Chicagoan of the Year in Jazz" by the Chicago Tribune. She is on Pitchfork’s Next 25 list of emerging artists to look out for, and was also New York Winter Jazz Festival 2022 Artist in Residence premiering her latest composition "Afro Town Topics: An Afrofuturist Mythological Musical Revue.

Albums

 The Oracle (International Anthem, 2019)
 Angel Bat Dawid / Tha Brothahood, LIVE (2020)
 Hush Harbor Mixtape No. 1: Doxology (2021)

References

American jazz clarinetists